Rede Internacional de Televisão (International Television Network, in English), better known as RIT is a Brazilian religious television network, owned by Igreja Internacional da Graça de Deus, led by the missionary R. R. Soares. The programming of this channel is produced for all ages, and almost all of its programming is self-produced. The TV content is interdenominational, meaning that it is produced for the Protestant public in general. Their programs are varied, with children's shows, religious shows, some music shows and journalism.

In Brazil, RIT owns eight owned-and-operated stations, has more than 170 affiliates and more than 120 million viewers in all Brazilian states. RIT is transmitted in Brazil through systems such as UHF, VHF, cable and satellite. This channel also has its own transmission website.

History
RIT was founded on August, 1999. The project was a television channel with quality, but, there were difficulties to do it. The channel succeeded. Time to time, RIT started news and entertainment shows such as "Movimento Jovem", "Consulta ao Doutor", "Zig Zag Show", and others.

References

External links
Official Website

Television networks in Brazil
Portuguese-language television networks
Television channels and stations established in 1999
Evangelical television networks
1999 establishments in Brazil